Heapey is a civil parish in the Borough of Chorley, Lancashire, England.  The parish contains 14 buildings that are recorded in the National Heritage List for England as designated listed buildings. Of these, one is listed at Grade II*, the middle grade, and the others are at Grade II, the lowest grade.  Other than part of the village of Wheelton, the parish is almost completely rural, and a high proportion of the listed buildings are, or originated as, farmhouses or farm buildings.  The other listed buildings are a church and a structure in the churchyard, a canal lock, and a war memorial on the form of a clock tower.

Key

Buildings

References

Citations

Sources

Lists of listed buildings in Lancashire
Buildings and structures in the Borough of Chorley